The Baykar Bayraktar TB3 is a Turkish medium-altitude long-endurance (MALE) unmanned combat aerial vehicle (UCAV) capable of short-range landing and take-off, produced by Baykar. It is currently being developed due to the lack of aircraft to be deployed on the TCG Anadolu amphibious assault ship. According to the initial plans the ship was expected to be equipped with Lockheed Martin F-35B Lightning II fighter jets but following the removal of Turkey from the procurement program, the vessel entered a modification process to allow it to be able to accommodate UAVs.

Development 
In February 2021, the chairman of the Presidency of Defense Industries (SSB) Ismail Demir made public a new type of UAV being developed by Baykar that is planned to be stationed on Turkey's first amphibious assault ship, TCG Anadolu. The aircraft being developed is a naval version of the Bayraktar TB2, powered by an engine developed by Turkish company Tusaş Engine Industries (TEI). Demir said that between 30 and 50 folding-winged Bayraktar TB3 UAVs will be able to land and take off using the deck of Anadolu. According to Baykar's Chief Technology Officer (CTO) Selçuk Bayraktar, the first flight of the Bayraktar TB3 will occur in 2022.

Specifications (Bayraktar TB3) 

Data from official Baykar infographic.

General characteristics 

 Crew: 0 onboard
 Length: 
 Height: 
 Wing span: 
 Max take-off weight: 
 Payload capacity: 
 Powerplant: 1 × TEI PD170 (expected)

Performance 

 Maximum speed: 
 Cruise speed: 
 Communication range: line-of-sight propagation

Armaments
Hardpoints: 6 hardpoints for laser-guided smart munition, with provisions to carry combinations of :
 L-UMTAS (Long Range Anti tank Missile System)
 MAM: MAM-C, MAM-L and MAM-T precision-guided munitions
 Roketsan Cirit (70 mm Missile System)
 TUBITAK-SAGE BOZOK Laser Guided Rockets
TUBITAK-SAGE TOGAN Air-to-surface launched 81 mm mortar munition
TUBITAK-SAGE KUZGUN Modular joint ammunition KUZGUN-TjM  Turbojet engine variant with range of 245 kilometers and KUZGUN-SS  Free Soaring variant range of 110 kilometers variants in use

Avionics
Interchangeable EO/IR/LD imaging and targeting sensor systems or Multi Mode AESA Radar:
Aselsan CATS EO/IR/LD imaging and targeting sensor (expected)

See also

References

International unmanned aerial vehicles
Medium-altitude long-endurance unmanned aerial vehicles
Unmanned military aircraft of Turkey
Unmanned aerial vehicles of Turkey